Éric Bellion (born 15 March 1976 in Versailles, Yvelines) is a French sailor.

He is a teacher and mentor in management, specialising in the handicapped and diversity and a communications consultant and also a charitable donor. He is a graduate of the Emlyon Business School and the Copenhagen Business School.

A keen sailing enthusiasts at the age of 26 with two friends, Eric managed to sail around the world via the three capes on a small 8.60 m boat. That was the Kifouine Challenge, Eric Bellion’s first big adventure, which was to be followed by two other great meaningful projects: the Integration Challenge between 2007 and 2010 and Team Jolokia after that.

He finished 9th in the 2016-2017 Vendee Globe and was the first none professional sailor. He produced a documentary film released in 2019 of his Vendee Globe voyage called "Comme un seul homme".

References

External links 
 

1976 births
Living people
Emlyon Business School alumni
People from Versailles
French male sailors (sport)
Sportspeople from Versailles, Yvelines
IMOCA 60 class sailors
French Vendee Globe sailors
2016 Vendee Globe sailors
Vendée Globe finishers
Single-handed circumnavigating sailors
21st-century French people